The Annals of the New York Academy of Sciences is an academic journal published by Wiley-Blackwell on behalf of the New York Academy of Sciences. It is one of the oldest science journals still being published, having been founded in 1823. The editor-in-chief is Douglas Braaten. Each issue is of substantial length and explores a single topic with a multidisciplinary approach. A review published on Ulrichsweb states the scope is enormous and describes the journal as highly respected and the articles as penetrating.

Abstracting and indexing
The journal is abstracted and indexed in:

According to the Journal Citation Reports, the journal has a 2019 impact factor of 4.728, ranking it 13th out of 71 journals in the category "Multidisciplinary sciences".

References

External links 
 
 

1823 establishments in New York (state)
English-language journals
Multidisciplinary scientific journals
Publications established in 1823
Science and technology in New York City
Wiley-Blackwell academic journals